Dwars door het Hageland is a cycling race held annually in Belgium. Up until 2019, it was a part of the UCI Europe Tour as a category 1.1 event, though between 2010 and 2012, it was a category 1.2 event. In 2020, the race was promoted to the newly created UCI ProSeries as a category 1.Pro event.

In 2021 a women's race was added as a category 1.2 event, but in 2022 it was already upgraded to a category 1.1 event.

Winners

Men's race

Women's race

References

Cycle races in Belgium
UCI Europe Tour races
Recurring sporting events established in 2001
2001 establishments in Belgium